Lucius Pomptinus was a Roman commander of Marcus Crassus in the Third Servile War.

Third Servile War
Pomptinus was made one of Crassus' commanders following his order by the senate to defeat Spartacus and his army of slaves. When Gannicus and Castus, two of Spartacus' former commanders, split from the main force with around 12,300 rebels, Pomptinus and another commander: Quintus Marcius Rufus, were dispatched to defeat them. Two legions were placed under his and Pomptinus' command, and they succeeded in defeating both Gannicus and Castus somewhere in Cantenna, during the decisive battle in 71 BC. 

1st-century BC Romans
Third Servile War